Twilight Force is a Swedish symphonic power metal band known for their highly fantastical lyrics and LARP-style outfits which the band performs onstage in. The band's main lyrical themes are based on the lore of a fictional world known as The Twilight Kingdoms, created by keyboardist Daniel Beckman. The band has released four studio albums to date.

The band members play under the use of nicknames, and wear costumes on stage that mirror the band's lyrical themes. The group describes themselves as "adventure metal," in part due to the use of costumes, props, and demeanor onstage. The band has cited early role-playing games like Heroes of Might & Magic and table-top role-playing games like Dungeons & Dragons as inspiration for their appearance.

History 
The idea behind Twilight Force was conceived in the mid-2000s by guitarist Philip Lindh and keyboardist Daniel Beckman. Although the project at the time was mostly conceptual, the two would go on to write much of the material that can be found on Twilight Force's first two albums even before they had actually formed the band in 2011. Some of these songs did not make the cut for the first album, and would instead be used in later works. Beckman, a lecturer, musician, and sound technician, was often touring or working with other acts, and at the time, vocalist Christian Eriksson (then known as Christian Hedgren) was living in Los Angeles, California. For this reason, Lindh and Beckman's project remained dormant for a few years until 2013, when the rest of the members were able to commit to the band. A recording studio in Beckman's home, colloquially dubbed the "Twilight Forge", was a major step in allowing band members to record, mix, and master tracks freely. 

Shortly after, bassist Dunder Björn Lundqvist, guitarist Jocke Leandro Johansson, drummer Daniel Sjögren, and vocalist Christian Eriksson were brought onto the project. The four had all previously played together in several split-up local bands from Falun, namely Mandrake, SkyRide, and Zia. Although Sjögren was not immediately made a member of the band and was not featured on the band's debut album, he joined the group later as a replacement for then-drummer Robban Bäck, who was unable to perform live with the band.

The group made their debut performance in Madrid on November 30, 2013, before they had actually released any material publicly, while Johansson and Eriksson had done an acoustic set together the night before. Johansson played both sets with a broken index finger. With plenty of material for an album, the band started work on their debut album recording, Tales of Ancient Prophecies, which was released in 2014 by Black Lodge Records. The album hit 29th position in Swedish charts. Immediately after, the band began writing their second album.

In February 2016 the band announced they signed a deal with Nuclear Blast Records. Later that year, on August 26, they released their label debut called Heroes of Mighty Magic with Joakim Brodén and Fabio Lione as guest vocalists. In early October 2017, it was announced that Christian Eriksson had left the band. He was temporarily replaced by Tommy Johansson during their tour as a special guest of DragonForce in October and November 2017. Eriksson claims that he suddenly received a text from the other band members saying that he was no longer part of the band, and that they had found a temporary replacement, Tommy Johansson, for their upcoming tour. Additionally, the band cited his contribution to the works of the band as "nonexistent". In June 2018, Alessandro Conti of Trick or Treat and formerly of Luca Turilli's Rhapsody was announced as the new vocalist.

On May 23, 2019, the band revealed the title and album art for their third album, Dawn of the Dragonstar, which was released August 16, 2019. The album was the first to feature Conti (as Allyon) on vocals.

On November 5, 2019, the band announced that drummer Daniel Sjögren had departed the band. Sjögren clarified that his decision to leave the band was amicable. Isak Olsson, also from Falun, was immediately brought in to fill the role of De'Azsh.

On November 3, 2022, the band announced the title of their fourth studio album, At the Heart of Wintervale, which was released on January 20, 2023.

Members

Current members
 Alessandro Conti (Allyon) – vocals (2018–present) (Trick or Treat, Luca Turilli's Rhapsody)
 Philip Lindh (Lynd) – lead guitar, acoustic guitar, lute (2011–present)
 Jocke Leandro Johansson (Aerendir) – rhythm guitar (2013–present)
 Dunder Björn Lundqvist (Born) – bass (2013–present)
 Daniel Beckman (Blackwald) – keyboards, piano, violin, cembalo (2011–present)
 Isak Olsson (De'Azsh) – drums (2019–present)

Former members
 Daniel Sjögren (De'Azsh) – drums (2013–2019) (ex-ReinXeed (live), Bloodbound)
 Christian Eriksson (Chrileon) – vocals (2013–2017)
 Robban Bäck (Roberto) – drums (2013) (ex-Sabaton, Mustasch)

Touring members
 Joakim Brodén – vocals (2017) (Sabaton)
 Tommy Johansson – vocals (2017) (Sabaton, Majestica)

Timeline

Discography

Studio albums
Tales of Ancient Prophecies (2014)
Heroes of Mighty Magic (2016)
Dawn of the Dragonstar (2019)
At the Heart of Wintervale (2023)

References

Swedish power metal musical groups
Musical groups established in 2011
Nuclear Blast artists
Swedish symphonic metal musical groups
2011 establishments in Sweden